This article details the fixtures and results of the Azerbaijani national football team in 2010s.

Matches

2010

2011

2012

2013

2014

2015

2016

2017

2018

2019

References

2010s
football team results